Perisomena is a genus of moths in the family Saturniidae.

Species
Perisomena alatauica (Bang-Haas, 1936)
Perisomena caecigena (Kupido, 1825)
Perisomena codyi (Peigler, 1996)
Perisomena haraldi (Schawerda, 1922)
Perisomena huttoni (Moore, 1862)
Perisomena stoliczkana (Felder & Felder, 1874)
Perisomena svenihedini (Hering, 1936)

See also

References

Saturniinae